The Victoria Cross is a surviving 1916 American drama silent film directed by Edward LeSaint and written by Paul M. Potter and Margaret Turnbull. The film stars Lou Tellegen, Cleo Ridgely, Sessue Hayakawa, Ernest Joy, Mabel Van Buren and Frank Lanning. The film was released on December 14, 1916, by Paramount Pictures.

Plot

Cast    
Lou Tellegen as Major Ralph Seton
Cleo Ridgely as Joan Strathallen
Sessue Hayakawa as Azimoolah
Ernest Joy as Sir Allen Strathallen
Mabel Van Buren as Princess Adala
Frank Lanning as Cassim
Harold Skinner as Seereek

Preservation status
A print is preserved in the Library of Congress collection Packard Campus for Audio-Visual Conservation.

References

External links 
 

1916 films
1910s English-language films
Silent American drama films
1916 drama films
Paramount Pictures films
Films directed by Edward LeSaint
American black-and-white films
American silent feature films
1910s American films